Epitymbia eudrosa is a species of moth in the family Tortricidae. It is found in Australia, where it has been recorded in Queensland.

The wingspan is 12–14 mm. The forewings are ochreous whitish, with a lustrous sheen. The markings are bright ferruginous. The hindwings are grey.

References

Moths described in 1916
Epitymbiini